This is a list of states in the Holy Roman Empire beginning with the letter W:

References

W